Yao Chi-Ling (born ) is a Taiwanese weightlifter, competing in the 75 kg category and representing Chinese Taipei at international competitions. 

She competed at world championships, including at the 2015 World Weightlifting Championships.

Major results

References

External links
http://kazan2013.com/hide/en/-240/Participant/ParticipantInfo/c4a3e75f-1dff-4599-a654-522ff05f0fc3
https://barbend.com/2016-asian-weightlifting-championships-full-results/
http://www.iwf.net/2011/07/07/last-womens-category-at-the-jwc/
http://www.gettyimages.com/photos/chi-ling-yao-weightlifting?excludenudity=true&mediatype=photography&page=1&phrase=Chi%20Ling%20Yao%20weightlifting&sort=mostpopular

1993 births
Living people
Taiwanese female weightlifters
Place of birth missing (living people)
Weightlifters at the 2010 Summer Youth Olympics
Weightlifters at the 2014 Asian Games
Weightlifters at the 2018 Asian Games
Universiade bronze medalists for Chinese Taipei
Universiade medalists in weightlifting
Asian Games competitors for Chinese Taipei
20th-century Taiwanese women
21st-century Taiwanese women